Charles Wilson was a footballer who made one FA Cup appearance for Burnley as a wing half.

Personal life 
Wilson served in the Royal Air Force during the Second World War.

Career statistics

References 

People from Hackney, London
Clapton Orient F.C. wartime guest players
Association football wing halves
Year of birth missing
Year of death missing
Place of birth missing
Place of death missing
Burnley F.C. players
Royal Air Force personnel of World War II
English footballers